Wisconsin Vorwärts ("Wisconsin Forward") was a German language newspaper published in Milwaukee, Wisconsin from 1892 to 1932. The newspaper was an organ of the Social-Democratic Party of Wisconsin, with Victor L. Berger as the founding editor. The offices of the newspaper were located at 530 Chestnut Street, Milwaukee.

References

1892 establishments in Wisconsin
1932 disestablishments in Wisconsin
Defunct newspapers published in Wisconsin
German-American culture in Wisconsin
German-language newspapers published in Wisconsin
Mass media in Milwaukee
Newspapers established in 1892
Publications disestablished in 1932
Socialist newspapers published in the United States